Vielha e Mijaran is a municipality in Aran, Lleida, Catalonia, Spain. It was created in 1970 by the merger of the municipalities of Arròs e Vila, Betlan, Escunhau, Gausac, Vielha and Vilac: some of the former municipalities retain some privileges as "decentralised municipal entities" (entitats municipals descentralitzades, EMD), as does the village of Betren. Mijaran literally means "Middle Aran" in Aranese, as the inhabited part of the municipality is situated in the valley of the Garonne (Garona). The Noguera Ribagorçana has its source on the territory of the municipality, on the opposite side of the watershed. The ajuntament (town hall) is in Vielha, spelled Vielha in Occitan and Viella in Catalan and Spanish, which is also the capital of Aran.

The municipality is linked to France and to the rest of Catalonia (via the Vielha tunnel) by the N-230 road. The C-28 (old name: C-142) road continues up the valley to Naut Aran, and on over the Port de la Bonaigua (2,072 m, 6,798 ft) to the comarca of Pallars Sobirà. This road, the higher stretches of which are impassable in winter, was the only route between the Aran valley and the rest of Spain before the opening of the Vielha tunnel in 1948.

Subdivisions 
The municipality is composed of thirteen distinct settlements. Populations are given :
Arròs (95)
Aubèrt (104), in the EMD of Aubèrt e Betlan
Betlan (24), on the left bank of the Garonne
Betren (376), on the left bank of the Garonne
Casarilh (64), in the EMD of Escunhau e Casarilh, on the left bank of the Garonne
Casau (87), inhabited in Roman times
Escunhau (89)
Gausac (555)
Mont (25), on the right bank of the Garonne at the foot of the Es Cròdos range
Montcorbau (17), on the right bank of the Garonne
Vielha (2,620)
Vila (30)
Vilac (147)

Climate

Politics 
{| class="sortable" width="100%"
|

{| class="sortable" width="100%"
|

Photos

Sister cities 
  Saint-Gaudens, France

References

Sources
 Panareda Clopés, Josep Maria; Rios Calvet, Jaume; Rabella Vives, Josep Maria (1989). Guia de Catalunya, Barcelona: Caixa de Catalunya.  (Spanish).  (Catalan).

External links 
Official website 
 Government data pages 

Municipalities in Val d'Aran